Hazlehead Park is a public park in the Hazlehead area of Aberdeen, Scotland. 180 hectares in size, it was opened to the public in 1920, having formerly been the estate of Hazlehead House, home of William Rose, shipbuilder. It is heavily wooded and contains many walking tracks.

There are football pitches, two golf courses, a pitch and putt course and a horse-riding school. The park has a significant collection of sculpture by a range of artists, including the memorial to those who died in the Piper Alpha disaster. It also has heritage items which have been rescued from various places within the city, and it features Scotland's oldest maze, first planted in 1935.

In 2022, Hazlehead Park was one of nine parks in Aberdeen and Aberdeenshire to be commended with a Green Flag award for sustainability and maintenance. 

In September 2007, Hazlehead Park was host to the Northsound Radio concert, Free 2007. It took place on Sunday 2 September 2007, and claims to be the biggest free outdoor event in Scotland.

The park is home to a Parkrun.

Golf

The park has two 18 hole and a 9 hole golf course as well as a foot-golf area. The courses are public owned and there are no handicap or other restrictions for those who play on them.

The "Number 1 course" was designed by Alistair MacKenzie, who also designed the Augusta National.

Cafe
The park has its own cafe which was refurbished and reopened in 2013. It is operated by the same company as the cafe at Duthie Park. The cafe was severely damaged in a fire in the evening of 11 December 2020, which was subsequently determined to have been started deliberately. It had been expected to be reopened by the end of 2021, but instead opened on 28 May 2022.

Transport 

Hazlehead Park was the terminus of one of the Aberdeen Corporation Tramways routes. Service was withdrawn in 1958. Bus number 4 replaced the tram route and operated between the park and the beach. It was withdrawn in 1986.

See also
 Green Spaces and Walkways in Aberdeen

References

Further reading
 Information about William Rose is sourced from "The Gilcomston Story", an account of Gilcomston Church from its beginnings to 1945, written by Francis Lyall. The relevant section is the piece regarding Rev. Robert Forgan.

External links
Hazlehead Golf Courses
Hazlehead Park

Parks in Aberdeen
Mazes in the United Kingdom